The Port of Ashdod is one of Israel's three main cargo ports. The port is located in Ashdod, about 40 kilometers south of Tel Aviv, adjoining the mouth of the Lachish River. Its establishment significantly enhanced the country's port capacity. It handles the largest volume of cargo containers annually (1.525 million TEU in 2017) of all Israeli ports. Ships carrying humanitarian aid for the Gaza Strip also unload their cargo at Ashdod.

History 

The need to open another deep water port arose in Israel's early years, when it became clear that the expansion of the existing ports of Haifa and Eilat could not ensure efficient handling of the increasing volume of export and import cargoes. The decision to start the new port was based on a number of considerations:
 The port meshes with the concern for population dispersal and the establishment of urban centers in the southern part of the country.
 The port substantially shortens the overland transport of cargoes to and from the southern and central parts of the country.
 The distance from the citrus groves of Rehovot to the Port of Ashdod is 102 km shorter than to Haifa's port and the transport of potash from Sodom to the Port of Ashdod is 120 km less than to Haifa.
 The port is close to the existing transport arteries with the possibility of developing new routes in the future.
 The port is situated near the industrial and production centers of the country, as well as to Tel Aviv, the commercial center.

The Port of Ashdod remains one of the few deep water ports in the world to be built on the open sea, and its construction involved great engineering challenges. The decision on the location and construction of the port was preceded by a maritime and climatic survey which confirmed the engineering feasibility of its construction. The physical design began in 1957-1958, a critical time, both from the point of view of the development of maritime transport and port facilities for cargo handling, and from the point of view of the development of cargo vessels. It was during this period that modern shipping concepts began to be applied throughout the world.

Its construction was based on a long term development plan. Breakwaters were built to create a harbor where quays could be built and developed in stages. In the first stage, quays 1 and 3 were built, mainly for the handling of citrus and other agricultural exports.
Other parts of the port were allocated for future development, as special needs arose.
Thanks to this approach, the Port of Ashdod has managed so far to supply satisfactory solutions to the new types of cargoes and vessels which developed since its opening.
Modern vessels, maritime transport methods, and appropriate port facilities have developed very rapidly over the last 30 years. World shipping has undergone a real revolution vis-a-vis vessel size, new cargo handling concepts based on containerized and unitized cargo, large consignments of liquid and dry bulk products. etc.

The port began operations on November 21, 1965, with the entry of the Swedish ship "Wingland" and its cargo of sugar.

Eitan terminal 
The Eitan terminal, completed in 2006, involved extending the main breakwater by 1,150 meters and reclaiming 100 hectares which allowed the addition of 1,700 meters of new operational quays capable of supporting Super Post-Panamax vessels.

During the construction of the breakwater, retired IDF Chief of Staff Rafael "Raful" Eitan, who was supervising the construction, died when he was swept off the breakwater by a large wave into rough seas. In his memory, the new section of the port was named the 'Eitan Terminal'.

General cargo 
Most of the work is carried out on six conventional piers which handle such cargoes as agricultural exports, citrus fruit, timber, metals, pelletized cargo, sling cargo, bulk cargo in grabs, etc. These piers can handle all types of ships of up to 30,000 tons. Pier no. 5 has been deepened and fitted to work Panamax type ships of up to 60,000 tons deadweight. The piers are outfitted with excellent equipment for efficient working. There are also 4 berths for Roll On/Roll Off ships, one of them on the container pier.

Storage 
The port's storage space totals about 500,000 m². Of these, 50,000 m² are covered, for general cargo storage. There is also a special shed for storing hazardous materials, chemicals, etc. which may not be stored in enclosed spaces or open areas.

Coal pier 
In the beginning of the 1990s the first generating unit in the new Rutenberg Power Station at Zikim, near Ashkelon, went into operation, fired by coal imported through the Port of Ashdod. The port has the necessary facilities for moving the incoming coal from the coal pier to the coal storage yard in the rear of the port, east of the Ashdod power station. There it was loaded on railcars for transport to the power station at Zikim. In 1988 the building of pier 9 was completed, which made possible the unloading of 2.5 million tons coal per year. In August 1989, the building of a conveyor, which transports coal from pier 9 to the coal yard, was completed, and with it the Port of Ashdod's preparation for the "coal age" was concluded on schedule.

In September 1989, the 120,000 ton collier M.S. Leon entered port with 85,000 tons of coal. The coal was unloaded by crane unto the conveyor and taken to the Coal Company at the rear of the Ashdod power station. The big ship was brought into port by modern Voit-Schneider type tugboats, which have an exceptional maneuverability and a bollard pull of 35 and 45 tons respectively. Bringing 160,00 G.R.T. ships into the port (at partial load capacity) is a considerable accomplishment in view of the fact that the Port of Ashdod was intended for navigation by ships of maximum deadweight of 30,000 tons (before the port was expanded in the 2000s).

In 2000, a deepwater coal pier was completed at the Rutenberg Power Station site which made transporting coal by rail from Ashdod no longer necessary.

Bulk handling

Minerals
The specialized minerals handling pier was opened in 1967. In 1979 more modern systems were added to the old ones. All are computer controlled.
The bulk installations can store 240,000 tons of phosphates (in 10 separate categories) and 140,000 tons of potash (separated in 5 categories).
The minerals arrive in the port in special railcars and trucks. Their discharge into the stores is carried out by conveyor systems and heaping machinery, at a rate of 800 to 1,500 tons per hour. The loading onto ships is carried out by two loaders, one at a rate of 800 tons per hour and the other at 1,600 tons per hour. Another loader is to be installed shortly to speed the operation.
The potash loading ships anchor at the dolphins, where the water's depth is 12.5 meters, allowing the mooring of Panamax ships of up to 225 meters in length and 60,000 tons capacity.

Grain
Although the rear of the port area contains a large grain elevator, the port's grain unloading capacity is constrained by the fact that grain has to be transported from the docks to the silos using trucks. To alleviate this constraint, a US$75 million, 2.5 km long elevated conveyor system between the docks and silos is being constructed as of 2021. This conveyor will significantly increase the grain handling capacity of the port.

Passengers and cruise ships 
Following the signing of the interim agreement between the governments of Israel and Egypt in the spring of 1975, the era of passenger cruise ships opened in the port.

In September 1975, the first ship, Stella Polaris, arrived in the port from Alexandria. In 1981, the traffic gathered momentum and since then the tourist traffic through the port has been growing. The terminal adjoins the debarkation area and allows passengers quick and convenient access. As the passenger traffic grew, the building of a new passengers terminal was approved and it is now in an advanced stage of planning. All passenger ship matters are handled by the security department and port services.

Southern Terminal construction 
In 2015, the Israel Ports Authority commenced construction of a major expansion of the port named the Southern Terminal (נמל הדרום) at a cost of NIS3.3 billion (appx. US$900 million), expected to open in 2021. The first phase of the plan involves extending the existing main breakwater by 600m, the construction of a secondary 1.5 km breakwater, extensive land reclamation which will create a new container terminal with an 800m main quay capable of handling up to 18,000 TEU container ships and a secondary 500m quay, as well as an on-site freight rail terminal.

The new terminal is being constructed by Pan Mediterranean Engineering (PMEC, a subsidiary of China Harbour Engineering). Switzerland-based Terminal Investment Limited (also known as the TiL Group, controlled by the privately-held MSC Group) won the bid for the concession to operate the new terminal for a period of 25 years starting in 2021.

Alongside the new terminal, development plans being carried out also include the construction of additional cargo storage and logistical support areas near the port, electrical and communications networks, and new access roads connecting to the local and national traffic network.

See also 
Ashdod Port attack
List of seaports
Cargo ship
Shipping

References

External links 

 

Ashdod
1965 establishments in Israel
Port
Ashdod